Nakul Abhyankar (born 25 May 1990) is an Indian playback singer, music composer and sound engineer. He has sung in  Kannada, Tamil, Telugu, Malayalam and Tulu. He is best known for his songs "Love You Chinna" from the film "Love Mocktail" composed by Raghu Dixit, "Thumbi Thumbi" from the film "Cobra" composed by A. R. Rahman Neeli Kannumalo", a solo from  Nawab a Telugu dubbed version of a Tamil movie Chekka Chivantha Vaanam directed by Mani Ratnam,  "CEO in the House" from the Tamil film Sarkar and Azhage from Tamil movie Action.

Biography 
He is trained in both the Hindustani and Carnatic styles of classical music. He received training in jazz singing at KM Music Conservatory and was a part of A.R. Rahman's jazz band, Nafs. He graduated from National Institute of Technology Karnataka with a degree in mechanical engineering in 2012.

Discography

As a singer

As a composer/music director

References

External links 
 Interview for Galata Tamil (Sarkar 2018)
 Interview for Independent Reviewer
 Romantic albums unveiled on V-Day

1990 births
Living people
Tamil playback singers
Kannada playback singers
Indian male playback singers
Telugu playback singers
Malayalam playback singers